Conservative Union may refer to:
Conservative Union (Greece)
Conservative Union (Spain)
CDU/CSU